Crashday is a destruction derby/racing/car stunts game co-developed by Replay Studios and Moonbyte Games and published by Atari Europe. It was released in February 2006.

Gameplay 
Crashday puts the accent on air stunts, crashes that result in explosions, and vehicular combat with bullets. Each vehicle can receive damage while racing, which results in losing parts and smashed headlights and windows. The game has seven modes to play along the campaign and multiplayer  such as Wrecking Match, Stunt Show or Race, as well as unique Crashday classics like Hold The Flag, Pass The Bomb or Bomb Run.

Steam Greenlight and re-release 
On 24 June 2016, Crashday was posted on Steam Greenlight submissions. Crashday was successful in receiving enough votes to be greenlit, and was later announced to be re-released on 10 August 2017. On 11 March 2017, the Steam version was renamed to "Crashday: Redline Edition", with some screenshots showing the new UI and the improved graphics. It was released on 10 August 2017.

Reception

References

External links
Official website

2006 video games
Atari games
Fiction about death games
Racing video games
Video games developed in Germany
Windows games
Windows-only games
Multiplayer and single-player video games